Argyrotaenia urbana is a species of moth of the family Tortricidae. It is found in the Federal District of Mexico.

References

U
Moths of Central America
Moths described in 1912